William Francis Thomas O'Byrne (30 April 1908 – 23 October 1951) was an English cricketer.  O'Byrne was a right-handed batsman.  He was born at Bromley, Kent.

O'Byrne made a single first-class appearance for Sussex against Cambridge University at the County Ground, Hove in 1935.  In Sussex's first-innings, he was dismissed for 8 runs by James Cameron. In their second-innings, he was dismissed for 26 runs by the same bowler.  This was his only major appearance for Sussex.

He died at St Leonards-on-Sea, Sussex on 23 October 1951.

References

External links
William O'Byrne at ESPNcricinfo
William O'Byrne at CricketArchive

1908 births
1951 deaths
People from Bromley
English cricketers
Sussex cricketers